Ryan Michael Guy (born September 5, 1985, in Carlsbad, California) is a professional soccer player and coach who was last player-coach of USL League Two club SoCal Surf and represented the Guam national team.

Life
Guy was born in San Diego County, California to former Guam Legislature senator Jesse Anderson Lujan and Sandra Guy-Willoughby.

Career

College and amateur
After attending La Costa Canyon High School, Guy enrolled at the University of San Diego, after being recruited by a number of other schools. In his sophomore season Guy earned First Team All–West Coast Conference and 2nd Team–NSCAA All-West Region honors.

During his college years, Guy also played for both Boulder Rapids Reserve in the USL Premier Development League and Southern California Fusion in the National Premier Soccer League.

Professional

Guy was drafted in the 2nd round (22nd overall pick) of the 2007 MLS SuperDraft by FC Dallas. Despite being offered a developmental contract by Dallas, Guy sought a professional contract in Europe. He attended trials at a number of clubs, including Crystal Palace FC of England and Hannover 96 of Germany but in February 2007, joined St Patrick's Athletic of Ireland. He made his League of Ireland debut for the Irish club on April 6, 2007, coming on as a substitute in the 83rd minute of a 1–0 win over Galway United. He scored his first goal for the Saints on the 15 July.

On July 17, 2008, Guy was written into the St Pat's history books as he scored the only goal in a UEFA Cup First Qualifying Round match against JFK Olimps Riga of Latvia, keying the club's first-ever away European win. On October 18, Guy scored a hat trick in a 3–1 win over Shamrock Rovers in the South-Dublin derby.

In 2009, Guy helped guide St. Pat's past Valletta F.C. & Krylia Sovetov Samara in the 2009-10 UEFA Europa League 2nd & 3rd qualifying rounds, however Guy's St. Pat's side lost to FC Steaua București in the play-off round 5–1 on aggregate. Ryan Guy was voted the St Patrick's Athletic Supporters Club Player of the Year for 2009. He made 44 appearances across all competitions and scored 6 goals. He scored the opening goal of the 2010 League of Ireland season, which was also the first ever goal in the Airtricity League.

His performance over 2009 and 2010 earned him a spot on the OT XI compiled by SoccerOverThere.com, ranking his performance relative to his league as one of the best 11 by an American in Europe. During the 2010 season, Guy was chosen for the League of Ireland XI who played Manchester United in the inaugural match in Aviva Stadium in Dublin.

Guy currently holds the Pats record for most European appearances with 14.

In January 2011, he left St. Pats for "personal reasons" to return to his homeland. Upon his return to the US, Guy had a short stint with the San Diego Flash of the National Premier Soccer League, and trialled with the Portland Timbers and FC Dallas, before signing with New England Revolution on June 9, 2011, after a trial and recommendation from San Diego Flash head coach Warren Barton. He later went on to sign for NASL club San Antonio Scorpions. In 2016, he joined the North County Battalion as their player-coach.

International
In August 2012, Guy confirmed he would be representing Guam at international level. Guy made his International debut for Guam in the Philippine Peace Cup, and featured in all 3 group games. In January 2013, Ryan was called the star player of the Guam national team by then head coach Gary White in an article for BBC sport.

International goals
Score and Result lists Guam's goals first

Honors

 St Patrick's Athletic F.C. Player of the Year (1): 2009
 North American Soccer League NASL Cup (1): 2014

References

External links
 Player bio at USD Toreros official website
 Player profile at St Patrick's Athletic official website
 
 

1985 births
Living people
American people of Chamorro descent
Sportspeople from Carlsbad, California
Soccer players from San Diego
American soccer players
Guamanian footballers
Association football wingers
University of San Diego alumni
San Diego Toreros men's soccer players
Colorado Rapids U-23 players
Southern California Fusion players
FC Dallas draft picks
St Patrick's Athletic F.C. players
New England Revolution players
San Diego Flash players
San Antonio Scorpions players
SoCal Surf players
League of Ireland players
Major League Soccer players
USL League Two players
North American Soccer League players
League of Ireland XI players
National Premier Soccer League players
Guam international footballers
American expatriate soccer players
American expatriate sportspeople in Ireland
Expatriate association footballers in the Republic of Ireland
Expatriate footballers in Hong Kong
American soccer coaches
USL League Two coaches
Association football player-managers